Juan Caballero (born 17 June 1958) is a Peruvian footballer. He played in 16 matches for the Peru national football team from 1980 to 1986. He was also part of Peru's squad for the 1983 Copa América tournament.

References

1958 births
Living people
Peruvian footballers
Peru international footballers
Place of birth missing (living people)
Association football forwards
Club Deportivo Universidad César Vallejo managers